Kalinino may refer to:

 Tashir, Armenia
 Kalinino, Azerbaijan
 Kalinino, Kazakhstan
 Kalininsk, Kyrgyzstan
 Kalinino, Astrakhan Oblast, Russia
 Kalinino, Chuvashia, Russia